Nagamasa (written: 長政 or 長正) is a masculine Japanese given name. Notable people with the name include:

, Japanese daimyō
, Japanese daimyō
, Japanese samurai
, Japanese daimyō
, Japanese daimyō
, Japanese daimyō
, Japanese explorer

Japanese masculine given names